The Plutonium Finishing Plant (PFP), also known as 'Z Plant', was part of the Hanford Site nuclear research complex in Washington, US.

Operations 
The plant began in 1949 with the purpose of on-site production of plutonium metal in a form suitable for weapons at Hanford. It also participated in programs to recycle plutonium. One of the projects was the use of mixed plutonium-oxide uranium-oxide (MOX) fuel in the Fast Flux Test Facility (FFTF). For that project, one of the PFP's tasks was to perform quality assurance for the fuel pins that had been constructed for the FFTF by outside vendors, such as Kerr-McGee, NUMEC, and Babcock & Wilcox.

The major activities at PFP generally included:
 Created plutonium 'buttons', used to make weapons, until 1989
 Special nuclear material handling and storage
 Plutonium recovery
 Plutonium conversion
 Laboratory support
 Waste handling
 Shutdown and operational facility surveillances.

Divisions
Plutonium Conversion Facility
'Remote Mechanical A' line - created plutonium oxide powder
'Remote Mechanical C' line - created metallic plutonium from plutonium nitrate

Plutonium Reclamation Facility
Produced 'high purity plutonium nitrate solution' from a 'variety of feed sources, including scrap'. Started in 1964 

Waste Treatment Facility
Neutralized liquid nuclear waste before it was pumped to Hanford's Tank Farms

Incinerator
Burned old clothes, filters, etc. to recover plutonium residue 

Other
Ventilation systems, nuclear storage vaults, chemical storage, office space, backup generator, etc.
RECUPLEX process, Plutonium recovery and recycle. Contaminated the ground with plutonium, carbon tetrachloride, and acidic waste

Cleanup and demolition 

Before the last four major facilities at the plant could be demolished, approximately 20 years of work was completed to stabilize approximately 20 tons (nearly 18 metric tons) of plutonium-bearing material by 2004; remove legacy plutonium from plant systems by 2005; ship all weapons-grade plutonium out of the plant and to the Savannah River Site by 2009; remove 238 large pieces of contaminated equipment, including glove boxes and fume hoods, and approximately 50 plutonium processing tanks; and demolish numerous plant support facilities, including the vault complex used for secure storage of plutonium by 2012. That preparatory work has been called the most hazardous cleanup work at the Hanford Site and PFP has been called Hanford's most hazardous building.

The Department of Energy's PFP Closure Project intends to have the entire facility cleaned and destroyed down to a concrete slab in 2017, with all contaminated materials moved to other sites. Open-air demolition of the plant's last four remaining major facilities began in November 2016 on the plant's Plutonium Reclamation Facility. Demolition of the second major facility, the Americium Recovery Facility, also known as the "McCluskey Room" because of a facility accident in 1976, began in January 2017 and was completed in March 2017. Demolition of the third remaining major facility, the ventilation stack and fan house, was completed in July 2017. Demolition of the last of four major remaining facilities, the Main Processing Facility, began in July 2017.   As of December 2017, all demolition is on hold, after contamination was found as far away as 10 miles from the site, and found in two car air filters that were checked  by a Hanford contractor and deemed clean, but rechecked by an independent lab and were found to have small amounts of radioactive contamination.

See also
Waste Isolation Pilot Plant, New Mexico

Notes

Nuclear technology in the United States
Nuclear fuel infrastructure in the United States
Hanford Site
Finishing plant